The 2020–21 Spartak Moscow season was the twenty-ninth successive season that the club played in the Russian Premier League, the highest tier of association football in Russia.

Season events
On 25 July, Aleksandr Rudenko joined Sochi on a season-long loan deal.

On 2 August, Spartak announced the signing of Aleksandr Kokorin to a three-year contract, with the option of an additional year, after his Zenit St.Petersburg contract had expired.

On 5 August, Spartak announced the signing of Oston Urunov to a long-term contract from FC Ufa.

On 6 August, Artyom Timofeyev joined Akhmat Grozny on a season-long loan deal.

On 12 August, Aleksandr Lomovitsky joined Khimki on a season-long loan deal.

On 14 August, Georgi Melkadze joined Artyom Timofeyev on loan at Akhmat Grozny for the season.

On 3 September, Guus Til joined Bundesliga side SC Freiburg on a season-long loan with option to buy.

On 1 October, Aleksandr Lomovitsky was recalled from his loan at Khimki, and sent on loan for the season to Arsenal Tula, where he was joined by Nikolai Rasskazov in a similar deal. The following day, Reziuan Mirzov joined Khimki on loan for the season.

On 15 October, Spartak Moscow announced the signing of Victor Moses on loan from Chelsea for the remainder of the season, with an option to make the move permanent.

On 16 January, Spartak Moscow announced the signing of Jorrit Hendrix from PSV Eindhoven for the remainder of the season, with an option to make the move permanent.

Squad

Out on loan

Transfers

In

Loans in

Out

Loans out

Released

Friendlies

Competitions

Premier League

League table

Results summary

Results by round

Results

Russian Cup

Round of 32

Round of 16

Squad statistics

Appearances and goals

|-
|colspan="14"|Players away from the club on loan:

|-
|colspan="14"|Players who left Spartak Moscow during the season:

|}

Goal scorers

Clean sheets

Disciplinary record

References

External links

FC Spartak Moscow seasons
Spartak Moscow